Prem Aamar is a 2009 Bengali romantic drama  film directed by Raj Chakraborty. It stars Soham Chakraborty and Payel Sarkar in lead roles. It was released on 9 October 2009. It is a remake of the Tamil-Telugu bilingual blockbuster film 7G Rainbow Colony.

Plot
Rabi (Soham) belongs to a lower-middle-class family and lives with his parents and his younger sister in a Railway Quarters Colony. He is seen by the others in the community as a good-for-nothing fellow as he skips classes, fails in exams, gets involved in fights, goes behind girls, and hangs out with friends most of the time. Rabi also thinks that his father hates him and often quarrels with him, even threatening to leave the house once and for all, only to be persuaded not to do so by his mother.

Rabi's life changes when a family comes into their colony below Rabi's house. Rabi finds that the family has a beautiful and educated girl, Riya (Payal) and falls for her heavenly beauty and charm, getting attracted to her gradually. Rabi tries to garner her attention but Riya has a poor opinion of him after watching his antics like creating trouble in a cinema and interrupting her performance during a colony get-together.

Riya, who gradually starts falling for Rabi, is warned about the fact that her life would be ruined if she would be with him and she is partially convinced. However, on Rabi's insistence, Riya escapes from her house, but unbeknownst to Rabi, she has planned to marry another man instead of him and refuses Rabi's advances saying that she doesn't love him and only came with him to a guesthouse to let him know of it. Rabi is infuriated and decides to make out with Riya and convince her, and when she refuses, he starts arguing with her and says he wants to be with her. 

They continue arguing as they exit the guesthouse. Upon crossing the road, Riya is knocked down by a truck, even as a helpless Rabi watches the horrible accident right before his eyes. Rabi is also hit by a speeding vehicle while running towards the scene. The scene shifts to the hospital where everyone is mourning Riya's demise and a badly wounded Rabi tries to get a glimpse of his lady love even as he is stopped by his friend Kamdev. Rabi goes to the morgue and finds Riya's dead body.

Later, Rabi is shown trying to be unsuccessful in committing suicide, as he survives every time. His last attempt leads to utter chaos on a busy city road and leads to several people beating him up. He is saved by a small group of nuns and as they try to talk to him, he sees Riya passing by. Riya takes him from those nuns and goes with Rabi walking. They settled down at a place and Riya pleads with Rabi to go on with his life so that she can be alive with his memories and love. Finally, Riya left an injured crying Rabi in the street symbolising that it is Rabi's illusion that makes Riya alive in his memories forever.

Cast
 Soham Chakraborty as Rabi
 Payel Sarkar as Riya
 Biswajit Chakraborty as Riya's father
 Laboni Sarkar as Riya's mother
 Tathoi Deb as Rabi's sister
 Tulika Basu as Rabi's mother
 Supriyo Dutta as Rabi's father
 Parthasarathi Chakraborty as Rabi's friend
Shweta Bhattacharya as Riya's Friend
 Suman Banerjee as Riya's fiance
 Prasun Gain

Soundtrack 

Jeet Gannguli composed the music, and Priyo Chattopadhyay, Gautam Sushmit, and Anindya Chatterjee wrote the lyrics.

External links
 

2009 films
Bengali-language Indian films
Bengali remakes of Tamil films
Films scored by Jeet Ganguly
2000s Bengali-language films
Films directed by Raj Chakraborty
2009 romantic drama films
Indian romantic drama films
Films about depression